Lynsey McCullough (born March 1, 1991) is a Northern Irish former professional tennis player who represented Ireland. She played for the Ireland Fed Cup team from 2009 to 2012, achieving a win–loss record of 7–6. She now coaches junior tennis players in Northern Ireland

Career
Irish Indoors U18 Winner – January 2009
U18 Scottish National Champion – February 2009
Ulster Junior Open U18 Winner – July 2009
Co. Antrim U18 Junior Champion – August 2009
South of Ireland Omni Court Senior Champion – April 2009
South of Ireland Senior Champion – June 2009
Ulster Senior Ladies Champion – June 2009
Larne Senior Open Champion – June 2009
Co. Dublin Senior Open Champion – July 2009
Ballycastle Ladies Champion – July 2009
South of Ireland Omni Court Championships Doubles Winner – April 2009
Ulster Senior Doubles Champion – June 2009
Co. Dublin Championships Doubles Winner – July 2009
Ballycastle Doubles Champion – July 2009
Ulster Senior Championships Mixed Doubles Winner – April 2009
Co. Dublin Championships Mixed Doubles Winner – July 2009
Co. Wicklow Senior Mixed Doubles Winner – August 2009
Larne Senior Championships Mixed Doubles Winner – June 2009
Ballycastle Senior Mixed Doubles Winner – July 2009
Lynsey was awarded the "Larne Junior Sports Performer of the Year" in 2009. She was also the winner of the O'Shee award, presented by Tennis Ireland, which is awarded to the most outstanding junior girl of the year.
McCullough has had the honour to represent her country and province at such a young age;
The Federation Cup (Ireland) in Malta – April 2009
Senior Interprovincials (Ulster) – August 2009
Junior Interprovincials (Ulster) – August 2009
4 Nations (Ireland) in Glasgow – September 2009

References

External links
 
 

1991 births
Living people
Irish female tennis players